Strikers Mountain is a 1987 Canadian action drama film starring Leslie Nielsen, August Schellenberg, and Mimi Kuzyk. It was nominated for two Gemini Awards, the biggest part of the film was filmed near Jasper, Alberta.

Plot
A construction conglomerate, headed by a ruthless millionaire, wants to buy a ski resort that has been a family business for years, but the family does not want to sell. The businessman resolves to get the property, whether they want to sell it or not.

Cast
Leslie Nielsen as Jim McKay
August Schellenberg as Jake Striker
Mimi Kuzyk as Trisha
Bruce Greenwood as Paul Striker
Jessica Steen as Lowni Striker
Steve Atkinson as Eddie
Caroline Barclay as Sandra McKay
Darlene Bradley as Edith
Ernst Buehler as Leo
Francis Damberger as Bill
Frances Flanagan as Mrs. Patterson
Robin Gammell as Rob Wilmer

Accolade
Writer Pete White was nominated for a Gemini Award for Best Writing in a Dramatic Program
and Best Writing in a Dramatic Program or Series (Original Drama).

See also
 The Climb

References

External links
 
 

1987 films
1980s action drama films
Canadian action drama films
English-language Canadian films
Films shot in Alberta
Films scored by John Mills-Cockell
1987 drama films
1980s Canadian films